Gartnanoul is a megalithic court tomb located in Killykeen Forest Park, Loughtee Upper, County Cavan, Ireland. Gartnanoul is called a dual-tomb because it has two tombs both in line with each other, with each tomb having its own court. The roof stones are missing although the tomb is in good condition and cairn materials are found scattered around the tomb.

Gallery

References

Tourist attractions in County Cavan
National Monuments in County Cavan
Archaeological sites in County Cavan